The Barham River is a perennial river of the Corangamite catchment, located in the Otways region of the Australian state of Victoria.

Location and features
The Barham River rises as the West Branch of the river in the Otway Ranges near Marriner Ridge and flows generally south then east before reaching its confluence with the East Branch of the river near the locality of Paradise, and then flows directly east towards the town of Apollo Bay where the river reaches its mouth and empties into Bass Strait, north of Cape Otway. From its highest point, the river descends  over its  course.

Etymology
The river's name is derived from the Aboriginal words Barrum or Burrum, meaning "river" or "junction of two rivers". The name of the river was first recorded by European surveyor George Smythe, with the name Burrum believed to mean a "stony river bed".

See also

References

External links

Corangamite catchment
Rivers of Barwon South West (region)
Otway Ranges